Gerdeh Bon (also Romanized as Gerdeh Ben; also known as Gerdeh Bīn) is a village in Lahijan-e Sharqi Rural District, Lajan District, Piranshahr County, West Azerbaijan Province, Iran. At the 2006 census, its population was 531, in 87 families.

References 

Populated places in Piranshahr County